Central Range Point is a mountain in Taiwan with an elevation of 3,703 m (12,149 ft). It looks like a triangular pyramid from the north and south sides, being the south side very steep and difficult to climb. The normal climbing route comes from Nanhu Mountain. Its west side path, the normal route continuing south, is also known as the "Death Crest" due to its danger.

See also
 List of mountains in Taiwan

Mountains of Taiwan
Landforms of Taichung 
Mountaineering in Taiwan